G-W Invader is a line of small recreational power boats that were manufactured by Arne Gray and George Wooldridge of Sharpsville, Indiana, United States.

History
G-W Invader, (sometimes listed as GW Invader), began production in 1967 with its 10-foot and 16-foot boats. The "G-W" indicated the last names of the founders. The initial designs of 10 and 16 footers were that of sport racing boats with a very low profile, low weight, and shallow draft. The Invader hulls and decks were constructed of fiberglass over a wood structure or frame. Models were available in a variety of colors as well as unique color combinations at an added cost to the customer. G-W went on to increase the models and styles of boats. Arnie Gray sold his portion of G-W Invader boat factory to George Wooldridge before he moved to Tampa, Florida where he lived until he died in 1997. Transfer of ownership after sale to Mr. Wooldridge has been mentioned but not substantiated. Roger Harmon bought the company in 1985, and later sold it in 1995 to a Muncie, Indiana-based investment firm. G-W Invader expanded and moved into a new factory in Tipton, Indiana in 1993, a building formerly occupied by Pioneer Hi-Bred.  Shortly after the expansion, they filed bankruptcy.  G-W Invader ceased production of boats after 1997.

Roger Harmon later started Harmon Boats Fiberglas Specialists LLC in Sharpsville and Cicero, Indiana.

Models

10 foot G.W. Invader 
The design of the 10-foot model gave the appearance of a racing boat with extremely shallow V-hull. Power was exclusively outboard engine. Seating was either a bench seat or 2 bucket seats.
Length: 10 feet, 3 inches 
Beam: 61 inches
Weight: 250 lbs
Maximum Horsepower: 40 hp four stroke, 50 hp two stroke

13 foot Banchie
Manufactured beginning in the 1970s, it has a more conventional V-hull and seated 5 people with a rear bench seat and 2 bucket seats up front.
Length: 13 feet
Beam: 70 inches
Weight: N/A
Maximum Horsepower: N/A
Transom height: N/A

14 foot
Length: 14 feet, 1 inches
Beam: 62 inches
Weight: 350 lbs
Maximum Horsepower: 95
Transom height: 20 inches

14 foot V hull
Designed with the more conventional V-hull.
Length: 14 feet, 1 inches
Beam: 62 inches
Weight: 350 lbs
Maximum Horsepower: 95
Transom height: 20 inches

15 foot V hull
Length: 15 feet, 1 inches
Beam: 63 inches
Weight: 385 lbs
Maximum Horsepower: 100
Transom height: 20 inches

15 foot tunnel hull
This model had a tunnel hull unusual for recreational boats of the time.
Length: 15 feet
Beam: 81 inches
Weight: 550 lbs
Maximum Horsepower: 150
Transom height: 25 inches

16 foot Intruder
The design of the 16-foot model had seating for four individuals. It was available as a sterndrive or could be mounted with an outboard motor. This model had a squared nose 
Length: 16 feet
Beam: 72 inches
Weight: 475 lbs
Maximum Horsepower: 160
Transom height: 20 inches

18 foot Bravo
Length: 18.25 feet, 1 inches
Beam: 92 inches
Weight: 2250 lbs
Maximum Horsepower: 115/175 4.3V6
20 Gallon Fuel Tank
iBoat Listing
 
Transom height: N/A inches

180 ESS
Length: 18 feet
Beam: 92 inches
Weight: 2250 lbs
Maximum Horsepower: 205
Transom height: N/A

20 foot Bravo ESC
Inboard model. It has two personal seats and a bench seat. There is also a cabin in which you can sleep.
Length: 20 feet
Beam: 96 inches
Transom height: 30 inches
Engine model: Mercruiser 4.3l V6
Maximum horsepower: 205

Rivera 220 Sport
This was an inboard model and came in the color gold or silver. 
Length: 22 feet
Beam: 81 inches
Weight: 2750 lbs
Maximum Horsepower: Inboard, horsepower N/A
Transom height: N/A

References

Iboats.com: G-W Invader.
Some information obtained from sales pamphlet.

American boat builders
High-speed craft
Defunct companies based in Indiana